Robert Laman Webber (October 14, 1924 – May 19, 1989) was an American actor. He appeared in dozens of films and television series, roles that included Juror No. 12 in the 1957 film 12 Angry Men.

Early life 
Webber was the son of Robert Webber, who was a merchant seaman. He graduated from Oakland Technical High School. Webber enlisted in the United States Marine Corps in 1943 during World War II, serving in the 1st Marine Amphibious Corps and later in the 6th Marine Division as a 776-Radio Operator (Low Speed) in Guam and Okinawa. Webber was discharged in 1945 as a private first class and was awarded the Navy Combat Action Ribbon, the Navy Presidential Unit Citation, the American Campaign Medal, the Asiatic–Pacific Campaign Medal and the World War II Victory Medal.

Career

Webber had a 40-year career as a character actor, during which he appeared as Juror No. 12 in 12 Angry Men (1957), as Dudley Moore's gay lyricist in 10 (1979), and the father of Cybill Shepherd's character in the hit series Moonlighting.

Other notable turns were in the movies The Sandpiper, in which he played a supporting role as Elizabeth Taylor's character's former lover; The Nun and the Sergeant, in which he played the lead; The Dirty Dozen, where he played a general who disliked the character portrayed by Lee Marvin; a sadistic lowlife encountered by Paul Newman in the anti-hero detective drama Harper; a hitman in Sam Peckinpah's Bring Me the Head of Alfredo Garcia; and a killer in the Dean Martin spy spoof The Silencers. Other notable movies  include The Great White Hope (1970), Midway (1976), Revenge of the Pink Panther (1978), Private Benjamin (1980), S.O.B. (1981), and Wild Geese II (1985). Several of the movies were directed by Blake Edwards.

On television, Webber appeared in many of the popular dramas of the time, including Alfred Hitchcock Presents, Mannix, Kojak,The Outer Limits, The Virginian, The Fugitive, Ben Casey, Route 66, I Spy, The Rifleman, Mission: Impossible and Ironside.

He appeared in four episodes of Cannon: the 1971 episode "The Nowhere Man" as McMillan, the 1972 episode "That Was No Lady" as Clay Spencer," the 1973 episode "Memo From a Dead Man" as Barney Shaw and the 1974 episode "A Voice From the Grave" as the Hitman.

Webber appeared in four episodes of The Rockford Files: the January 1975 episode "Aura Lee, Farewell" as Senator Evan Evan Murdock, the October 1975 episode "The Deep Blue Sleep" as  Bob Coleman, the 1976 episode "The Oracle Wore  a Cashmere Suit" as Roman Clementi and the episode "Never Send a Boy King to Do a Man's Job" as Harold Jack Coombs. 

Webber also guest-starred on Barnaby Jones in the 1978 two-part episode “Final Judgment” as Gene Gates.

Death 

Webber died from amyotrophic lateral sclerosis (also known as Lou Gehrig's disease) at age 64 in Malibu, California.

Filmography

Film 

 Highway 301 (1950) as William B. Phillips
 12 Angry Men (1957) as Juror #12
 The Nun and the Sergeant (1962) as Sgt. McGrath
 The Stripper (1963) as Ricky Powers
 Hysteria (1965) as Chris Smith
 The Sandpiper (1965) as Ward Hendricks
 The Third Day (1965) as Dom Guardiano
 The Silencers (1966) as Sam Gunther
 Harper (1966) as Dwight Troy
 Tecnica di un omicidio  (1966) as Clint Harris
 Dead Heat on a Merry-Go-Round (1966) as Milo Stewart
 The Dirty Dozen (1967) as Brigadier General James Denton
 Don't Make Waves (1967) as Rod Prescott
 Every Man Is My Enemy (1967) as Tony Costa
 Manon 70 (1968) as Ravaggi
 The Big Bounce (1969) as Bob Rodgers
 The Great White Hope (1970) as Dixon
 Macédoine (1971) as Sandeberg
 $ (1971) as Attorney
 Bring Me the Head of Alfredo Garcia (1974) as Sappensly
 Flatfoot in Hong Kong (1975) as Sam Accardo
 Soldat Duroc, ça va être ta fête (1975) as Sergeant John Lewis
 Midway (1976) as Rear Admiral Frank Jack Fletcher
 Hit Squad  (1976) as Mr. Duglas
 Death Steps in the Dark (1977) as Inspector
 Madame Claude (1977) as Howard
 The Accuser aka L'Imprécateur (1977) as Le cadre américain
 The Choirboys (1977) as Deputy Chief Riggs
 Casey's Shadow (1978) as Mike Marsh
 Revenge of the Pink Panther (1978) as Philippe  Douvier
 Gardenia (1979) as Caruso
 10 (1979) as Hugh
 Courage - Let's Run (1979) as Charley
 Tous vedettes (1980) as Harry Stabling
 Private Benjamin (1980) as Col. Clay Thornbush
 Sunday Lovers (1980) as Henry Morrison (segment "The French Method")
 S.O.B. (1981) as Ben Coogan
 Wrong Is Right (1982) as Harvey
 Who Dares Wins (1982) as General Ira Potter
 Wild Geese II (1985) as Robert McCann
 Nuts (1987) as Francis MacMillan

Television and radio 
 the 1969 pontiacs  ,"breakaway " comercial..;
 Starlight Theatre (1950)
 Out There (1951–1952) as Captain Bill Hurley
 Tales of Tomorrow (1952)
 Studio One (1952) as Skeets
 Eye Witness (1953)
 Suspense (1954) as James Forsythe
 Three Steps to Heaven (1953) as Chip Morrison
 Robert Montgomery Presents (1954)
 The Phil Silvers Show (1956) as Ego
 Kraft Television Theatre (1955–1957)
 Playhouse 90 (1958) as Malcolm Field
 The Rifleman (1959) as Wes Carney
 Alcoa Presents: One Step Beyond ('The Captain's Guests', episode) (1959) as Andrew Courtney
 Play of the Week (1960)
 Checkmate (1961) as Miles Archer
 The Investigators (1961) as Bert Crayne
 Thriller (1961) as Arthur Henshaw
 The Paradine Case (1962) as Andre Latour
 Alfred Hitchcock Presents (1959–1962) as Paul Brett, Harrison Fell, Edward Gibson
 Stoney Burke (1962) as Roy Hazelton
 The Dick Powell Show (1961–1962) as Captain John Wycliff
 Route 66 (1962) as Frank Bridenbaugh
 The Defenders (1962–1963) as Douglas, MichaelHillyer, Father Phelps,
 Naked City (1963) as Gordon Lanning
 The Greatest Show on Earth (1963) as Rudy
 The Nurses (1963) as Arthur Luskin
 Arrest and Trial (1963) as George Morrison
 Bob Hope Presents the Chrysler Theatre (1963) as Stuart Landsman
 Ben Casey (1963) as Slim
 The Fugitive (1964) as Harlan Guthrie
 Espionage (1964) as Jack Hanley
 Brenner (1964)
 Mr. Broadway (1964) as Hogan
 The Outer Limits (1964) as Ikar
 Kraft Suspense Theatre (1964–1965) as David Henderson, Robert Burke
 The Rogues (1965) as Guy Gabriel
 The Name of the Game (1968) as William McKendricks
 Journey to the Unknown (1969) as Manservant
 Special Branch (1969) as Mr. Snell
 The Bold Ones: The Lawyers (1969) as Sam Rand
 The Movie Murderer (1970) as Karel Kessler
 The Men From Shiloh, rebranded name of The Virginian (1970) as Jackson Reed
 San Francisco International Airport (1970)
 Hauser's Memory (1970) as Dorsey
 The Young Lawyers (1971) as Sergeant Fielder
 Mannix (1971) as Tom Carlson
 The Rivals of Sherlock Holmes (1971) as Commissioner of Oaths
 Thief (1971) as James Calendar
 Cutter (1972) as Meredith
 Banacek (1972) as Jerry Brinkman
 Mission: Impossible (1972) as Charles Rogan
 Love, American Style (1972)
 Banyon (1972)
 Search (1973) as Matthew Linden
 Hawkins (1973) as Carl Vincent
 Griff (1973) as Alan Gilbert
 Double Indemnity (1973) as Edward Norton
 The Magician as Zellman
 Tenafly (1973) as Kent
 Kojak (1973) as David Lawrence
 Murder or Mercy (1974) as Dr. Eric Stoneman
 Ironside (1973–1974) as Del Hogan, Burton
 Cannon (1971–1974) as McMillan, Clay Spencer, Barney Shaw, 4x03 Voice From The Grave as Jake McVea (Hitman)
 The Manhunter (1974)
 The Streets of San Francisco (1974) as Al Cooper
 McCloud (1971–1975) as Jack Faraday, Fritz August
 Death Stalk (1975) as Hugh Webster
 Switch (1975) as Paul Sinclair
 S.W.A.T. (1975) as McVea, Mike Simon
 Police Woman (1975) as Julian Lord
 McMillan & Wife (1977) as Charles Meridio
 79 Park Avenue (1977) as John Hackson DeWitt
 Barnaby Jones (1975–1978) as Maxwell Strager, Gene Gates
 The Young Runaways (1978) as Fred Lockhart
 Kaz (1978)
 The Rockford Files (1975–1979) as Senator Evan Murdock, Bob Coleman, Roman Clementi, Harold Jack Coombs
 Quincy, M.E. (1977–1979) as Dr. John Franklin
 The Streets of L.A. (1979) as Ralph Salkin
 Tenspeed and Brown Shoe (1980) as LaCrosse
 The Two Lives of Carol Letner (1981) as Ed Leemans
 Darkroom (1981) as Greg Conway
 Bret Maverick (1982) as Everest Sinclair
 Not Just Another Affair (1982) as Professor Wally Dawson
 Don't Go to Sleep (1982) as Dr. Cole
 Starflight: The Plane That Couldn't Land (1983) as Felix Duncan
 Shooting Stars (1983) as Woodrow Norton
 Getting Physical (1984) as Hugh Gibley
 No Man's Land (1984) as Will Blackfield
 Cover Up'''' (1984) as Mason Carter
 Half Nelson (1985)
 In Like Flynn (1985) as Colonel Harper
 Assassin (1986) as Calvin Lantz
 The Ladies (1987) as Jerry
 Moonlighting (1986–1988) as Alexander Hayes
 Something Is Out There'' (1988) as Commissioner Estabrook

References

External links 

 
 

1924 births
1989 deaths
American people of English descent
American male film actors
American male television actors
Deaths from motor neuron disease
United States Marine Corps personnel of World War II
United States Marines
20th-century American male actors
Neurological disease deaths in California